Silly Symphony is an American animated series of 75 musical short films produced by Walt Disney Productions from 1929 to 1939. As the series name implies, the Silly Symphonies were originally intended as whimsical accompaniments to pieces of music. As such, the films usually did not feature continuing characters, unlike the Mickey Mouse shorts produced by Disney at the same time (exceptions to this include Three Little Pigs, The Tortoise and the Hare, and Three Orphan Kittens, which all had sequels). The series is notable for its innovation with Technicolor and the multiplane motion picture camera, as well as its introduction of the character Donald Duck making his first appearance in the Silly Symphony cartoon The Wise Little Hen in 1934. Seven shorts won the Academy Award for Best Animated Short Film.

The series also spawned a Silly Symphony newspaper comic strip distributed by King Features Syndicate, and a Dell comic book series Silly Symphonies, as well as several children's books, many of which were based on Silly Symphony cartoons.

The Silly Symphonies returned to theaters with its re-issues and re-releases, and eventually tied with Joseph Barbera and William Hanna's Tom and Jerry'''s record for most Oscar wins for a cartoon series in the Academy Award for Best Animated Short Film category.

Production
While Walt Disney and Carl Stalling, a theatre organist from Kansas City, were in New York to add sound to the Mickey Mouse shorts The Gallopin' Gaucho, The Barn Dance and Plane Crazy, Stalling suggested the idea of making a series of musical animated shorts that combined the latest sound technology with storytelling. At first Walt did not seem interested, but when they returned to New York in February to record the sound for a fifth Mickey Mouse cartoon, The Opry House, they also recorded the soundtrack for The Skeleton Dance, the type of short that Stalling had suggested and the first Silly Symphony cartoon.

Within the animation industry, the series is known for its use by Walt Disney as a platform for experimenting with processes, techniques, characters, and stories in order to further the art of animation. It also provided a venue to try out techniques and technologies, such as Technicolor, special effects animation, and dramatic storytelling in animation, that would be crucial to Disney's plans to eventually begin making feature-length animated films.

Shortly after the switch to United Artists, the series became even more popular. Walt Disney had seen some of Dr. Herbert Kalmus' tests for a new three-strip, full-color Technicolor process, which would replace the previous two-tone Technicolor process. Disney signed a contract with Technicolor which gave the Disney studio exclusive rights to the new three-strip process through the end of 1935, and had a 60% complete Symphony, Flowers and Trees, scrapped and redone in full color. Flowers and Trees was the first animated film to use the three-strip Technicolor process, and was a phenomenal success. Within a year, the now-in-Technicolor Silly Symphonies series had popularity and success that matched (and later surpassed) that of the Mickey Mouse cartoons. The contract Disney had with Technicolor would also later be extended another five years as well.

The success of Silly Symphonies would be tremendously boosted after Three Little Pigs was released in 1933 and became a box office sensation; the film was featured in movie theaters for several months and also featured the hit song that became the anthem of the Great Depression, "Who's Afraid of the Big Bad Wolf". Several Silly Symphonies entries, including Three Little Pigs (1933), The Grasshopper and the Ants (1934), The Tortoise and the Hare (1935), The Country Cousin (1936), The Old Mill (1937), Wynken, Blynken, and Nod (1938), and The Ugly Duckling (1939, with an earlier black-and-white version from 1931), are among the most notable films produced by Walt Disney.

Due to problems related to Disney's scheduled productions of cartoons, a deal was made with Harman and Ising to produce three Silly Symphonies: Merbabies, Pipe Dreams, and The Little Bantamweight. Only one of these cartoons, Merbabies, ended up being bought by Disney, the remaining two Harman-Ising Silly Symphonies were then sold to MGM who released them as Happy Harmonies cartoons. Disney ceased production of Silly Symphonies in 1939.

Distribution
The series was first distributed by Pat Powers from 1929 to 1930 and released by Celebrity Productions (1929–1930) indirectly through Columbia Pictures. The original basis of the cartoons was musical novelty, and the musical scores of the first cartoons were composed by Carl Stalling.

Columbia Pictures
After viewing "The Skeleton Dance", the manager at Columbia Pictures quickly became interested in distributing the series, and gained the perfect opportunity to acquire Silly Symphonies after Disney broke with Celebrity Productions head Pat Powers after Powers signed Disney's colleague Ub Iwerks to a studio contract. Columbia Pictures (1930–1932) agreed to pick up the direct distribution of the Mickey Mouse series on the condition that they would have exclusive rights to distribute the Silly Symphonies series; at first, Silly Symphonies could not even come close to the popularity Mickey Mouse had. The original title cards to the shorts released by Celebrity Productions and Columbia Pictures were all redrawn after Walt Disney stopped distributing his cartoons through them. Meanwhile, more competition spread for Disney after Max Fleischer's flapper cartoon character Betty Boop began to gain more and more popularity after starring in the cartoon Minnie the Moocher; by August 1932, Betty Boop became so popular that the Talkartoon series was renamed as Betty Boop cartoons.

United Artists
In 1932, after falling out with Columbia Pictures, Disney began distributing his products through United Artists.  UA refused to distribute the Silly Symphonies unless Disney associated Mickey Mouse with them somehow, resulting in the "Mickey Mouse presents a Silly Symphony" title cards and posters that introduced and promoted the series during its five-year run for UA. United Artists also agreed to double the budget for each cartoon from $7,500 to $15,000.

RKO Radio Pictures
In 1937, Disney signed a distribution deal with RKO Radio Pictures to distribute the Silly Symphony cartoons, along with the Mickey Mouse series. RKO would continue to distribute until the end of the series in 1939.

Home media
Several Symphonies have been released in home media, most of the time as bonus shorts that relate to something within various Disney films. For instance, the original Dumbo VHS included Father Noah's Ark, The Practical Pig and Three Orphan Kittens as bonus shorts to make up for the film's short length. In the UK, several Symphonies were released in compilations under Walt Disney Home Video's "Storybook Favourites" brand. The three "Storybook Favourites Shorts" volumes released included among others, Three Little Pigs, The Tortoise and the Hare and the remake of The Ugly Duckling.

On December 4, 2001, Disney released "Silly Symphonies" as part of its DVD series "Walt Disney Treasures". On December 19, 2006, "More Silly Symphonies" was released, completing the collection and allowing the cartoons to be completely available to the public.

Some Disney Blu-ray discs includes Silly Symphonies as high definition special features. Show White and the Seven Dwarves includes six, Beauty and the Beast and Dumbo both contain two and Pixar's A Bug's Life contains one.

The Silly Symphony shorts originally aired on Turner Classic Movies' period program block "Treasures from the Disney Vault".

List of films
The Silly Symphonies are listed here in production order.

Reception
Disney's experiments were widely praised within the film industry, and the Silly Symphonies won the Academy Award for Best Animated Short Film seven times, maintaining a six-year-hold on the category after it was first introduced. This record was matched only by MGM's Tom and Jerry series during the 1940s and 1950s.

Legacy
The Symphonies changed the course of Disney Studio history when Walt's plans to direct his first feature cartoon became problematic after his warm-up to the task The Golden Touch was widely seen (even by Disney himself) as stiff and slowly paced. This motivated him to embrace his role as being the producer and providing creative oversight (especially of the story) for Snow White while tasking David Hand to handle the actual directing.Silly Symphonies brought along many imitators, including Warner Bros. cartoon series Looney Tunes and Merrie Melodies, MGM's Happy Harmonies, and later, Universal's Swing Symphony.

Years later after the Silly Symphonies ended, Disney occasionally produced a handful of one-shot cartoons, playing the same style as the Silly Symphony series. Unlike the Silly Symphonies canon, most of these "Specials" have a narration, usually by Disney legend Sterling Holloway.

The 1999–2000 television series Mickey Mouse Works used the Silly Symphonies title for some of its new cartoons, but unlike the original cartoons, these did feature continuing characters.

As of 2021, three of the Silly Symphony shorts (Three Little Pigs, The Old Mill, and Flowers and Trees), have been selected for preservation in the United States National Film Registry by the Library of Congress, for being "culturally, historically, or aesthetically significant".

Comic adaptations

A Sunday Silly Symphony comic strip ran in newspapers from January 10, 1932, to July 12, 1942. The strip featured adaptations of some of the Silly Symphony cartoons, including Birds of a Feather, The Robber Kitten, Elmer Elephant, Farmyard Symphony and Little Hiawatha. This strip began with a two-year sequence about Bucky Bug, a character based on the bugs in Bugs in Love.

There was also an occasional Silly Symphonies comic book, with nine issues published by Dell Comics from September 1952 to February 1959. The first issue of this anthology comic featured adaptations of some Silly Symphony cartoons, including The Grasshopper and the Ants, Three Little Pigs, The Goddess of Spring and Mother Pluto, but it also included non-Symphony cartoons like Mickey Mouse's Brave Little Tailor. By the third issue, there was almost no Symphony-related material in the book; the stories and activities were mostly based on other Disney shorts and feature films.

See also
Golden age of American animation
List of Disney animated shortsSilly Symphonies the newspaper comic strip, featuring adaptations of the animated shorts

References

Further reading
 Maltin, Leonard: The Disney Films. (Fourth edition.) New York: Disney Editions, 2000. .
 Merritt, Russel – Kaufman, J. B.: Walt Disney's Silly Symphonies: A Companion to the Classic Cartoons Series. Gemona: La Cinecita del Friuli, 2006. .

External links
 
 
 Silly Symphonies'' at The Encyclopedia of Disney Animated Shorts
 

Film series introduced in 1929
1920s Disney animated short films
1930s Disney animated short films
Animated film series
Visual music
American animation anthology series
 
Films scored by Carl Stalling
Silliness